There have been three baronetcies created for members of the Rowley family, one in the Baronetage of Great Britain and two in the Baronetage of the United Kingdom. Two of the creations are extant as of 2007.

The Rowley Baronetcy, of Tendring Hall (Stoke-by-Nayland) in the County of Suffolk, was created in the Baronetage of Great Britain on 27 June 1786 for the naval commander Rear-Admiral Joshua Rowley. He was the son of Admiral of the Fleet Sir William Rowley. The second Baronet sat as Member of Parliament for Suffolk. The third Baronet was a Vice-Admiral of the Blue. The sixth Baronet was a colonel in the Army. The seventh Baronet served as Lord-Lieutenant of Suffolk between 1978 and 1994. He died in 1997. In 2002 his kinsman Sir Charles Robert Rowley, 7th Baronet, of Hill House (see below) established his claim to the title.

The Rowley Baronetcy, of the Navy, was created in the Baronetage of the United Kingdom on 2 November 1813 for the Anglo-Irish naval commander Sir Josias Rowley. He was the nephew of the first Baronet of the 1786 creation. Rowley never married and the title became extinct on his death in 1842.

The Rowley Baronetcy, of Hill House in the County of Berkshire, was created in the Baronetage of the United Kingdom on 21 March 1836 for the naval commander Admiral Charles Rowley. He was the fourth son of the first Baronet of the 1786 creation. The seventh Baronet established his claim to the 1786 baronetcy in 2002. The eighth Baronet, Sir Richard Rowley, is a member of the executive committee of the Standing Council of the Baronetage.

Rowley baronets, of Tendring Hall (1786)

Sir Joshua Rowley, 1st Baronet (1734–1790)
Sir William Rowley, 2nd Baronet (1761–1832)
Vice-Admiral Sir Joshua Ricketts Rowley, 3rd Baronet (–1857)
Sir Charles Robert Rowley, 4th Baronet (1800–1888)
Sir Joshua Thellusson Rowley, 5th Baronet (1838–1931)
Sir Charles Samuel Rowley, OBE, 6th Baronet (1891–1962)
Sir Joshua Francis Rowley, 7th Baronet (1920–1997)
For further succession, see below

Rowley baronets, of the Navy (1813)
Sir Josias Rowley, 1st Baronet (1765–1842)

Rowley baronets, of Hill House (1836)
Admiral Sir Charles Rowley, GCH, GCB, 1st Baronet (1770–1845), youngest son of the 1st Baronet Rowley of Tendring Hall.
Sir Charles Rowley, 2nd Baronet (1801–1884)
Sir George Charles Erskine Rowley, 3rd Baronet (1844–1922)
Sir George Charles Augustus Rowley, 4th Baronet (1869–1924)
Sir George William Rowley, 5th Baronet (1896–1953)
Sir William Joshua Rowley, 6th Baronet (1891–1971)
Sir Charles Robert Rowley, 7th Baronet, 8th Baronet (1926–2008) (succeeded as eighth Baronet of Tendring Hall in 1997)
Sir Richard Charles Rowley, 8th Baronet, 9th Baronet (born 1959)

The heir apparent to both baronetcies is Joshua Andrew Rowley (born 1989), eldest son of the 9th/8th Baronet.

The senior baronetcy is Rowley of Tendring Hall and takes that position in the order of precedence.

Should the male line of the 1st Baronet Rowley of Hill House become extinct, both Baronetcies will become extinct as no other male lines are in remainder to the 1st Baronet Rowley of Tendring Hall.

Notes

External links
Portrait of Sir Charles Rowley, 1st Baronet

References
Kidd, Charles, Williamson, David (editors). Debrett's Peerage and Baronetage (1990 edition). New York: St Martin's Press, 1990, 
Official roll of the Baronetage 

Baronetcies in the Baronetage of Great Britain
Baronetcies in the Baronetage of the United Kingdom
Extinct baronetcies in the Baronetage of the United Kingdom
1786 establishments in Great Britain
1813 establishments in the United Kingdom